The following is a list of players who have competed on The Circle (sometimes called The Circle US to differentiate from other international versions). The series is an American reality competition series, produced by Studio Lambert and Motion Content Group which first aired on Netflix in January 2020 that is based on a British TV series of the same name.

As of the fifth season, 63 people have competed on The Circle.

Contestants

Notes

References 

The Circle
The Circle (franchise)